Preston Guild Hall is an entertainment venue in Preston, Lancashire, England.

History
The Guild Hall was commissioned to replace the town's Public Hall. The new building, which was designed by Robert Matthew, Johnson Marshall, was due to be ready for the Preston Guild of 1972, but after construction was delayed, it only officially opened in 1973.

The complex has two performance venues, the Grand Hall which holds 2,034 people and the Charter Theatre which holds 780 people. There is direct pedestrian access, via footbridge, from the adjacent Preston bus station and car park. Artists that have performed at the venue include Martha Argerich,  Morrissey, Led Zeppelin, David Bowie, The Jackson 5, Thin Lizzy, Busted and Steve Harley & Cockney Rebel among others. It also hosted the UK Snooker Championship for the years 1978 to 1997.

Until July 2014, it was owned by Preston City Council, who were considering its demolition due to its high running costs. It was then sold to local businessman Simon Rigby, who promised to spend £1m to renovate the venue. Rigby closed the venue in May 2019 and, in June 2019, he placed the business into administration. Preston City Council subsequently reclaimed possession of the building, citing the "unacceptable behaviour" of Rigby. The building was due to host the Business Expo in April 2020 but this event had to be cancelled due to the COVID-19 pandemic.

References

Music venues in Lancashire
Snooker venues
Buildings and structures in Preston
Theatres in Lancashire
Wrestling venues